Labdia calypta is a moth in the family Cosmopterigidae. It is found on Guadalcanal.

References

Natural History Museum Lepidoptera generic names catalog

Labdia
 Moths described in 1961